The grosbeak starling (Scissirostrum dubium), also known as the grosbeak myna, finch-billed myna, or scissor-billed starling, is a species of starling in the family Sturnidae. It is monotypic in the genus Scissirostrum. It is endemic to Sulawesi, Indonesia.

Its natural habitat is tropical lowland, and sometimes subtropical montane, lightly wooded forest areas and wetlands.

This species nests in colonies, which frequently contain hundreds of pairs. Its nests are bored in rotting or dying tree trunks in woodpecker style. It eats fruit, insects, and grain. Grosbeak starlings are highly vocal, at their colonies and in feeding flocks.

The grosbeak starling was first described by the English ornithologist John Latham in 1801 under the binomial name Lanius dubium.

References

grosbeak starling
Endemic birds of Sulawesi
grosbeak starling
Taxonomy articles created by Polbot